A launderette (laundromat) is a self-service laundry facility.

Launderette or laundrette or variation, may also refer to:

 Laundry machines at self-service laundries
 The Launderettes, a Norwegian rock band 
 "Launderette" (1980 song), a 1980 song by A Formal Sigh
 "Launderette" (1981 song), a 1981 single from the album Dirty Washing by Vivien Goldman
 "Launderette" (1999 song), a 1999 song by Bongshang from the album Vy-lo-fone
 The Laundrette (record), a record released from New Yorkshire
 "Laundrette" (episode), a 2012 episode of South Korean TV sketch comedy Gag Concert
 "Launderette" (advertisement), the name of an advertising campaign for Levi Strauss & Co. from 1985 for 501 jeans, created by ad firm Bartle Bogle Hegarty
 Bendix Launderette, a Bendix-made Telecoin-adapted laundry machine used at coin laundries, which became a genericized trademark

See also

 Gunfight at the O.K. Laundrette (episode), a 1979 British TV episode for Minder
 My Beautiful Laundrette (film), a 1985 British film
 Laundrywoman
 Laundress
 
 
 
 
 Washerwoman (disambiguation)
 The Laundress (disambiguation)
 Laundromat (disambiguation)
 Laundry